Arturo Ortiz Martínez (born 25 August 1992), also known as Palermo, is a Mexican professional footballer who plays as a centre-back for Liga MX club UNAM.

International career
On 27 April 2022, Ortiz made his senior national team under Gerardo Martino in a friendly match against Guatemala.

Career statistics

International

Honours
Individual
CONCACAF Champions League Best XI: 2022

References

External links
 
  
 
 

Living people
1992 births
Association football defenders
Unión de Curtidores footballers
Coras de Nayarit F.C. footballers
Club León footballers
Mineros de Zacatecas players
Leones Negros UdeG footballers
Correcaminos UAT footballers
Liga MX players
Ascenso MX players
Liga Premier de México players
Tercera División de México players
Sportspeople from Monterrey
Footballers from Nuevo León
Mexican footballers